The University of Azzaytuna  (AZU) (Arabic: جامعة الزيتونة), previously known as Al-Naser University, is the one of public universities in Libya. It is located in Bani Walid city – Libya. It was founded in 2001, and it was renamed back in 2011 after the 17 of February Revolution, to become what is now known as the Azzaytuna University.

Degrees 
The university provides undergraduate levels of study and awards the following degrees:
 Intermediate Certificate (Diploma).
 Bachelor's degree.
 Licentiate's degree
 Master's degree

Faculties

Faculty of Engineering 
The Faculty of Engineering has a leading role in its scientific career. In response to this development, the Faculty of Engineering made changes in its academic courses and academic structure. The Faculty of Engineering changed from four departments to fourteen departments to meet the needs and requirements of Libyan society and to achieve its aims and visions.

Departments 
 Department of Computer Engineering.
 Department of Civil Engineering.
 Department of Mechanical and Industrial Engineering.
 Division of Power
 Division of Industrial
 Division of Applied
 Department of Electrical and Electronic Engineering.
 Division of Power
 Division of Control
 Division of Telecommunication

Faculty of Sciences

Departments 
 Department of  Agricultural Science.
 Department of Computer science.
 Department of Environmental Sciences.
 Department of Technical Biology.

Faculty of Education 
The Faculty of Education is a continuation of high institution of teachers with its scientific educational departments to meet the needs of society from scientific and educational qualified teachers in accordance with integrated academic program as follows:

Study at faculty is by year system (four years) to academic year 2007/2008; then the study changed to academic class from 2008/2009; as the study period depends on what the student has fulfilled of courses as requirements for graduation, then the student grants the bachelor's degree of science and education or bachelor's degree of arts and education. All branches of specialized high schools are accepted in the faculty.

Departments 
 Department of Arabic Language.
 Department of Classroom Teacher.
 Department of English Language.
 Department of Kindergarten.
 Department of Physics.
 Department of Chemistry.
 Department of Biology.
 Department of Math.
 Department of Art and Music Education.

Faculty Of Economics and Political Sciences

Departments 
 Department of Economics.
 Department of Management.
 Department of Accountancy.
 Department of Political Science.
 Department of Banking and Finance.
 Department of Financial Planning

Faculty of Languages

Departments 
 Department of Arabic Language.
 Department of English Language.

Faculty of Law

Departments 
 Department of Public Law.
 Department of Private Law.
 Department of General Subjects.

References

Universities in Libya
Educational institutions established in 2001
2001 establishments in Libya